Spondylus varius, is a species of large marine bivalve mollusc in the family Spondylidae, the spiny oysters.

Description
Spondylus varius is the largest of the spiny oysters, reaching a maximum size of about 20 cm. Aside from the size, the shell is easily recognisable because its adult part is white, but a colourful (usually crimson, but it can be yellow) prodissoconch is clearly visible at the apical end.

Ecology
It lives at a depths of 30 m, and like most bivalves, is a filter-feeder, using plankton as a food source.

Distribution
This species can be found in the Indo-Pacific Ocean and off Australia, China, the Philippines, Japan, and Taiwan.

References

 WoRMS
 Encyclopedia of Life
 Discover life

External links
 Reeflex
 Mondo marino

Spondylidae
Bivalves described in 1827